Vurnarsky District (Vărnar rayonĕ) is an administrative and municipal district (raion), one of the twenty-one in the Chuvash Republic, Russia. It is located in the center of the republic and borders with Alikovsky and Krasnoarmeysky Districts in the north, Kanashsky District in the east, Ibresinsky District in the south, and with Shumerlinsky District in the west. Its administrative center is the urban locality (an urban-type settlement) of Vurnary. Population:  The population of Vurnary accounts for 28.1% of the district's total population.

Notable people
Maxim Mikhailov (1893–1971), operatic bass singer, born in Koltsovka
Praski Vitti (born 1936), Chuvash painter, born in the village of Algazino

References

Notes

Sources

 
Districts of Chuvashia

